The following is a list of episodes from the Disney Junior series Puppy Dog Pals.

Series overview

Episodes

Season 1 (2017–18)

Season 2 (2018–19)

Season 3 (2019–20)

Season 4 (2020–21)

Season 5 (2022–23)

Shorts

Short overview

Playtime with Puppy Dog Pals (2018)

Puppy Dog Pals Playcare (2019)

Notes

References

Puppy Dog Pals